Boda may refer to:

Geography
 Boda River, a river on Fiji
 Mount Boda, a mountain in Antarctica
 Boda, Hungary, a village in Baranya county, Hungary
 An area in Panchagarh District, Northern Bangladesh, India
 Boda Upazila, an area in Rangpur Division, Bangladesh
 Boda, Lobaye, a town in the prefecture of Lobaye, Central African Republic
 Boda, Rajgarh, a town in Madhya Pradesh, India

Sweden
 Böda, a village in Borgholm Municipality, Kalmar province
 Boda, Sweden, a village in Rättvik municipality, Dalarna province
 Böda Church, a church in Öland, Sweden
 Boda glasbruk, a village in Emmaboda Municipality, Kronoberg province
 Böda kronopark, a crown park (kronopark) on Öland
 Böda socken, a former county district on Öland

People
 Imre Boda (born 1961), Hungarian soccer player
 Katsushi Boda (Japanese: 保田 克史), Japanese stop-motion animator
 Victor Biaka Boda (1913-1950), Ivorian politician

Other
 Bridge of Don Academy (BODA), a Scottish school in Aberdeen
 BODA, a video codec made by Chips&Media

See also
 Boda boda, a bicycle taxi in Kenya, Tanzania, and Uganda 
 Ganesh Bodas (1880–1965), Indian actor
 La Boda (disambiguation)
 Bodan (disambiguation)